The Bundesjugendorchester (National Youth Orchestra of Germany, BJO) is the national youth orchestra of Germany, composed of pre-university students aged 14–19. It is supported by the project company of the Deutscher Musikrat and is based in Bonn. It was established in 1969, making it one of the oldest national youth orchestras in the world.

It is a member of the European Federation of National Youth Orchestras.

Activities 
The orchestra features young German musicians under the baton of renowned conductors such as Herbert von Karajan, Kurt Masur, Gerd Albrecht, Carl St. Clair, Steven Sloane, Eiji Ōue, Kirill Petrenko and Simon Rattle. The musicians qualify for membership by auditioning in front of a jury. During the work phases, the orchestra works under the guidance of private teachers, including members of the Berlin Philharmonic, and the respective conductor.

Every year, three- to four-week work phases are carried out, followed by a concert tour. Rotating conductors are in charge of the artistic direction. In addition, there are short-term special projects. Many former members now play in professional orchestras or have become well-known soloists.

In 2013, to mark the 50th anniversary of the Élysée Treaty, the Bundesjugendorchester performed a series of concerts together with its French counterpart, the Orchestre Français des Jeunes, under the direction of Dennis Russell Davies.

See also 
 List of youth orchestras

References

External links 

 

Music education organizations
National youth orchestras
Organisations based in Bonn
1969 establishments in West Germany
German youth orchestras